Hombres Con Pañales is the second production of K-Narias.

A CD/DVD, it contains 15 previously unpublished songs, recorded in Puerto Rico, under the production of Master Chris, Luny Tunes, Noriega, DJ Erick and Robert Taylor.

The DVD includes the concert in the Pabellón de Los Majuelos  (“The first concert live”), a special one on the visit to the prison TF2, a special news article of K-Narias in one night of celebration with their friends in Tenerife, images of Gara and Loida in New York, Puerto Rico, Los Angeles and other cities of the world; and previous videos, special “making of” and different sessions from photos of the pair.

The album also included three bonus tracks which were remixes of the hit song "No Te Vistas Que No Vas".Diwnxp in. P  memo in six

Track listing

DVD
 Th First Concert Live
 Especial "Prison TF2"
 De Marcha Con K-Narias
 De Viaje Con K-Narias
 Karaoke
 Fenomeno K-N
 Vip Access
 Making Off "No Te Vistas Que No Vas"
 Videos :"No Te Vistas Que No Vas" and "Quiero Que Bailen"

References

 Nuevo Album de K-Narias Hombres con Pañales-k-narias-Con Mas Flow Blog de Reggaeton, noticias,canciones,letras,videos, TV Show

External links
K-Narias - Hombres Con Pañales - Music Charts
The album at Napster.com 

2006 albums
Reggaeton albums
Albums produced by Noriega
Albums produced by Luny Tunes